Aprominta atricanella is a moth of the family Autostichidae. It is found in Bulgaria, North Macedonia and Greece.

The wingspan is about 16 mm. The ground colour of the forewings is whitish sprinkled with large, blackish grey scales. The hindwings are dark grey.

References

Moths described in 1906
Aprominta
Moths of Europe